The Valley Flyer is a train service run by Amtrak between New Haven, Connecticut and Greenfield, Massachusetts along Amtrak's New Haven–Springfield Line and the Massachusetts Department of Transportation's Connecticut River Line. 

Valley Flyer trains meet Acela and Northeast Regional services at New Haven Union Station where passengers can typically make a cross-platform transfer between trains. Departures on the Valley Flyer are timed to make day trips between the Connecticut River Valley and New York City possible.

South of Springfield, the Valley Flyer complements the Hartford Line commuter rail service operated by the Connecticut Department of Transportation and Amtrak's Hartford Line service. North of Springfield, it complements Amtrak's Vermonter, offering travelers in the Valley three daily round trips on the Connecticut River Line.

History
By February 2019, the two-year pilot was expected to begin in June 2019; however, by that May it was delayed to later in the year.

On August 30, 2019, the Valley Flyer program began with a 5:45 am departure south from Greenfield. As a basis for continuing the Valley Flyer permanently, MassDOT set a goal of attracting at least 24,000 new riders per year during the pilot program. To this end, the 2020 Massachusetts state budget provided $250,000 to market the program. Thewatsons—a New York-based ad agency that has worked with Grand Central Terminal and CTrides—was contracted in fall 2019 to create the marketing campaign. From March 30, 2020, to July 26, 2021, one daily round trip was suspended due to the COVID-19 pandemic.

In October 2022, MassDOT and Amtrak announced that the Valley Flyer service had matched projected ridership and would be made permanent.

Proposed extension
In the 2021 Vermont Rail Plan, VTrans modeled the potential extension of one daily Valley Flyer round-trip north from Greenfield to White River Junction, Vermont, and south from New Haven to Washington. This service would further supplement the Vermonter by doubling its frequency at four stations in Vermont and one in New Hampshire. VTrans forecast that this extension would attract an additional 30,500 to 50,200 riders per year by 2040. VTrans also considered extending a second daily Valley Flyer round-trip north to Brattleboro, but dropped this idea since the station lacks a turning mechanism.

Service
Two New Haven-Greenfield round-trips are offered on weekdays, with southbound trains in the morning and northbound in the evening. On weekends, one similarly scheduled New Haven-Greenfield round-trip is offered, in addition to a reverse round trip between Springfield and Greenfield. Valley Flyer trains meet Acela Express and Northeast Regional services at New Haven Union Station where passengers can typically make a cross-platform transfer between trains. Departures on the Valley Flyer are timed to make day trips between the Connecticut River Valley and New York City possible.

Stations

References

External links

 Valley Flyer | Trains In The Valley

New Haven–Springfield Line
Amtrak routes
Passenger rail transportation in Connecticut
Passenger rail transportation in Massachusetts
Railway services introduced in 2019
2019 establishments in Connecticut
2019 establishments in Massachusetts